James Kenneth Pegg (4 January 1926 – 25 August 1999), known as Jimmy Pegg or Ken Pegg, was an English professional footballer who played as a goalkeeper in the Football League for Manchester United, Torquay United and York City.

References

1926 births
Footballers from Salford
1999 deaths
English footballers
Association football goalkeepers
Manchester United F.C. players
Torquay United F.C. players
York City F.C. players
English Football League players